Lewis Paul Jimmy Richards (born 15 October 2001) is a professional footballer who plays for Wolverhampton Wanderers, as a  defender. Born in England, he represents Ireland at youth level.

Career
Richards began his career in the Brentford Academy, before moving to Wolverhampton Wanderers after the closure of the academy in 2016. 

On 13 January 2022, Richards joined League Two club Harrogate Town on loan for the remainder of the 2021–22 season, playing his first game for the club on 22 January in a 3–0 home win against Oldham Athletic, where he was substituted in the 82nd minute for Nathan Sheron.

He returned to Harrogate in July 2022 for a second loan spell. This was cut short in January 2023 when Richards sustained an ankle injury which ruled him out for four months and he returned to his parent club.

Career statistics

References

2001 births
Living people
Republic of Ireland association footballers
Republic of Ireland youth international footballers
English footballers
English people of Irish descent
Wolverhampton Wanderers F.C. players
Harrogate Town A.F.C. players
English Football League players
Association football defenders